This was the first edition of the tournament.

João Souza won the title after defeating Nicolás Kicker 6–4, 6–7(12–14), 6–2 in the final.

Seeds

Draw

Finals

Top half

Bottom half

References
 Main Draw
 Qualifying Draw

Adriatic Challenger - Singles